The Capital Markets Index (CPMKTS) was an investment tool that tracked the value of traditional investment-grade U.S. capital market securities. It viewed the markets broadly and included approximately 9,500 equity, fixed income, and money market instruments. The American stock exchange published sub-indexes CPMKTE, CPMKTB, and CPMKTL, tracking equities, bonds, and liquidity, respectively.

CPMKTS was launched by Dorchester Capital Management Company of Houston, Texas on May 4, 2006. The Capital Markets Index was carried on the American stock exchange that updated every 15 seconds. The trademark was canceled on October 24, 2014.

The index is inactive, and the last available data is from December 2015.

References

Sources

 
 
 
 
 

Bond market indices
Stock market indices